Agnosia is a genus of moths in the family Sphingidae first described by Walter Rothschild and Karl Jordan in 1903.

Species
Agnosia microta (Hampson 1907)
Agnosia orneus (Westwood 1847)

References

Smerinthini
Moth genera
Taxa named by Walter Rothschild
Taxa named by Karl Jordan